Supoj Saenla (born August 15, 1980) is a former Thai professional snooker player who lives in Chiang Mai.

Career
Saenla joined the professional tour for the first time in 2003 by winning the 2001 Asian U-21 Championship. He was relegated after the 2004/05 season. In 2007, he earned his place back by winning the 2007 Asian Championship. He beat India's Yasin Merchant 7–0 in the final of that tournament. Saenla finished the 2008/09 season 82nd in the world rankings, and lost his place on the main tour for the second time.

Career finals

Pro-am finals: 2 (1 title)

Amateur finals: 5 (4 titles)

References

External links
 
 Profile at prosnookerblog.com

1980 births
Living people
Supoj Saenla
Asian Games medalists in cue sports
Cue sports players at the 2006 Asian Games
Cue sports players at the 2002 Asian Games
Supoj Saenla
Medalists at the 2002 Asian Games
Supoj Saenla
Supoj Saenla
Southeast Asian Games medalists in cue sports
Competitors at the 2005 Southeast Asian Games
Competitors at the 2009 Southeast Asian Games
Supoj Saenla